SECORE (SExual COral REproduction) is an international non-profit organization focused on coral reef conservation. The group has over sixty supporters in North America, Europe and Japan, and comprises public aquariums, institutes, and universities. Founded in 2001 at the Rotterdam Zoo in the Netherlands, the organization has been developing methods of captive coral reproduction and preservation, citing studies that have predicted coral reefs could be extinct within decades due to climate change.

Background 
Based on the coral reproduction research of Dirk Petersen at the Rotterdam Zoo (The Netherlands), SECORE was born in 2002. Petersen's findings led to innovative techniques on the use sexual coral reproduction for coral reef conservation. Established by the aquarium community and coral conservation scientists, SECORE initially focused on ex situ conservation and later as well on reef restoration (in situ conservation).

In 2004, Mike Brittsan, M.Sc., of the Columbus Zoo & Aquarium joined SECORE to take over the leading role in the USA. Over the years, both institutions, the Rotterdam Zoo and the Columbus Zoo & Aquarium – in collaboration with other organisations – started a very successful workshop program not only to train experts in the SECORE techniques, but also to bring different institutions together for a common goal – help saving the greatest marine ecosystem on our planet, the coral reef. SECORE supports excellent science in various fields, such as coral restoration, coral population genetics or coral cryopreservation.

Together with its more than 60 supporting partner institutions, SECORE reaches millions of people to spread the word about the dramatic situation of our ocean and what we can do about it. In 2018, they were subject of coverage from VICE News for their work in the coral reefs of Curacao.

Supporters

Asia
 Ochanomizu University
 Marine Research Station Layang Layang

Europe

 The Deep
 National Marine Aquarium
 Aquarium La Rochelle
 Océanopolis
 Aquazoo – Löbbecke Museum in Düsseldorf
 Cologne Zoo
 Hagenbeck Zoo
 Ruhr University Bochum
 University of Duisburg-Essen
 Wilhelma Stuttgart
 Acquario di Genova
 Musee Oceanographique
 Artis Zoo
 Burgers Zoo
 Rotterdam Zoo
 Wageningen University
 Oceanario de Lisboa
 Planet Neptune Aquarium
 Zoo Aquarium de Madrid
 The Maritime Museum and Aquarium in Gothenburg
 Skansen-Akvariet

North America

 Curacao Sea Aquarium
 Audubon Aquarium of the Americas
 Aquarium in Moody Gardens
 Berkshire Museum Aquarium
 Birch Aquarium at Scripps
 Columbus Zoo and Aquarium
 Dallas Aquarium at Fair Park
 Discovery World
 Downtown Aquarium, Houston
 The Florida Aquarium
 Georgia Aquarium
 Hawaii Institute of Marine Biology
 Houston Zoo
 Indianapolis Zoo
 Minnesota Zoo
 National Aquarium in Baltimore
 National Aquarium in Washington, D.C.
 National Zoological Park (United States)
 New England Aquarium
 North Carolina Aquarium at Fort Fisher
 North Carolina Aquarium at Pine Knoll Shores
 Omaha's Henry Doorly Zoo
 Pennsylvania State University
 Pittsburgh Zoo & PPG Aquarium
 Point Defiance Zoo & Aquarium
 Seattle Aquarium
 Seaworld Orlando
 Seaworld Texas
 Shedd Aquarium
 University of Houston
 Virginia Living Museum
 Virginia Marine Science Museum

See also 
 Issues with coral reefs
 Iliana Baums

References

External links 
 SECORE website
 SECORE Workshop Curacao 2011
 Mary Hagedorn and Mike Henley. Rearing Elkhorn coral at the National Zoo
 Acropora palmata larve video, Coralscience.org
 Pennisi E. 2007. Reefs in trouble - spawning for a better life. Science 318(5857):1712-1717.

Marine conservation organizations
Coral reefs
International environmental organizations
Organizations established in 2002
2002 establishments in the Netherlands